Saint John's Tower, also called the Pigeon Tower, is a tower in Castledermot, County Kildare, Ireland. A former bell tower, it is all that remains of a medieval leper hospital and is a National Monument.

Location
Saint John's Tower is located on the northern end of the Main Street, Castledermot.

History
The Priory and Hospital of St John the Baptist was founded by Walter de Riddlesford and his wife in 1210, just outside the Dublin gate of the walled town of Castledermot. It was occupied by the Crutched Friars (Fratres Cruciferi) until its dissolution in 1541.

References

Christian bell towers
National Monuments in County Kildare
Religion in County Kildare
Towers in the Republic of Ireland